Sphinx gordius, the apple sphinx, is a moth of the family Sphingidae. The species was first described by Pieter Cramer in 1780.

Distribution 
It is found in the northern parts of the United States and southern Canada, mostly east of the Rocky Mountains, additionally it is found along the east coast to Florida and in the Rocky Mountains to Colorado.

Description 
The wingspan is 68–108 mm.

Biology 
The larvae feed on Malus, Rosa, Vaccinium and Fraxinus species.

Subspecies
Sphinx gordius gordius
Sphinx gordius oslari (Rothschild & Jordan, 1903) (Colorado)

References

External links

Sphinx (genus)
Moths described in 1780
Moths of North America